Z.C.B.J. Hall may refer to any of several buildings associated with Zapadni Ceska Bratrska Jednota, including:

ZCBJ Hall (Tyndall, South Dakota), listed on the National Register of Historic Places (NRHP)
Z.C.B.J. Hall (Arthur, Wisconsin), NRHP-listed in Chippewa County
ZCBJ Hall (Haugen, Wisconsin), NRHP-listed in Barron County

See also
List of Z.C.B.J. buildings
Z.C.B.J. Opera House (disambiguation)

🟥